Marthella is a genus of flowering plants in the Burmanniaceae, first described as a genus in 1903. It contains only one known species, Marthella trinitatis, endemic to the Island of Trinidad.  It is considered critically endangered and only naturally appears in Northern Range Forest Reserve Section B. As a conservation measure, it is being cared for in the Heights of Aripo Village as a form of ex situ conservation.

References

Burmanniaceae
Monotypic Dioscoreales genera
Endemic flora of Trinidad and Tobago